Events from the year 1887 in the United States.

Incumbents

Federal Government 
 President: Grover Cleveland (D-New York)
 Vice President: vacant
 Chief Justice: Morrison Waite (Ohio)
 Speaker of the House of Representatives: John G. Carlisle (D-Kentucky)
 Congress: 49th (until March 4), 50th (starting March 4)

Events
 January 20 – The United States Senate allows the Navy to lease Pearl Harbor in Hawaii as a naval base.
 January 28 – In a snowstorm at Fort Keogh, Montana, the largest snowflakes on record are reported. They are 15 inches (38 cm) wide and 8 inches (20 cm) thick.
 February 2 – In Punxsutawney, Pennsylvania, the first Groundhog Day is observed.
 February 4 – The Interstate Commerce Act, passed by Congress, is signed into law, with the intention of regulating the railroad industry.
 February 8 – The Dawes Act is signed into law by President Grover Cleveland.
 February 26 – Troy University is established as Troy State Normal School; an institution to train teachers for Alabama's schools.
 February – The Atlanta Cyclorama is first displayed in Detroit as "Logan's Great Battle".
 March 3 – Anne Sullivan begins teaching Helen Keller.
 March 7 – North Carolina State University is established as North Carolina College of Agriculture and Mechanic Arts.
 March 19 – Cogswell College is established as a high school by Dr. Henry D. Cogswell in San Francisco, the first technical training institution in the West (the school opens in 1888).
 April 4 – Argonia, Kansas elects Susanna M. Salter as the first female mayor in the U.S.
 May 14 – The cornerstone of the new Stanford University, in northern California, is laid (the college opens in 1891).
 June 28 – Minot, North Dakota is incorporated as a city.
 July 10 – The Grand Hotel opens in Mackinac, Michigan.
 August – The U.S. National Institutes of Health is founded at the Marine Hospital, Staten Island, New York, as the Laboratory of Hygiene.
 October 14 – Pomona College is founded in Claremont, California.

Undated
 Ruby Mining District (Salmon Creek District) is established in Washington state.
 Teachers College, later part of Columbia University, is founded by Grace Hoadley Dodge as the New York School for the Training of Teachers; Nicholas Murray Butler is its first president.

Ongoing
 Gilded Age (1869–c. 1896)

Sport 
September 28 – The Detroit Wolverines win the National League pennant with a 7-3 victory over the Indianapolis Hoosiers.
November 24 - Yale wins the Consensus College Football National Championship

Births
 January 22 
 David W. Stewart, U.S. Senator from Iowa from 1926 to 1927 (died 1974)
 Elmer Fowler Stone, first United States Coast Guard aviator (died 1936)
 February 6 – Ernest Gruening, U.S. Senator from Alaska from 1959 to 1969 (died 1974)
 February 7 – Eubie Blake, African American jazz composer-pianist (died 1983)
 February 11 – H. Kent Hewitt, admiral (died 1972)
 February 26 
 Grover Cleveland Alexander, baseball player (died 1950)
 William Frawley, actor best known for played Fred Mertz in I Love Lucy (died 1966)
 March 4 – Violet MacMillan, Broadway theater actress (died 1953)
 March 5 – Harry Turner, American football player (died 1914)
 March 14 – Charles Reisner, silent actor and film director (died 1962)
 March 22 – Chico Marx, comedian (died 1961)
 April 9 – Florence Price, African American classical composer (died 1953)
 April 15 – Mike Brady, golfer (died 1972)
 July 16 – Shoeless Joe Jackson, baseball outfielder (died 1951)
 July 31 – Peter Bocage, jazz musician (died 1967)
 September 8 – Jacob L. Devers, U.S. Army general (died 1979)
 September 9 – Alf Landon, Republican politician, presidential candidate (died 1987)
 September 28 – Avery Brundage, 5th president of the International Olympic Committee (died 1975)
 November 15 – Georgia O'Keeffe, painter (died 1986)
 December 19 – George R. Swift, U.S. Senator from Alabama in 1946 (died 1972)
 date unknown – White Parker, missionary and actor (died 1956)

Deaths
 January 7 – Aaron Shaw, U.S. Representative from Illinois (born 1811)
 March 8 – Henry Ward Beecher, clergyman and reformer (born 1813)
 March 24 – Justin Holland, classical guitarist and civil rights activist (born 1819)
 May 14 
 Lysander Spooner, philosopher and abolitionist (born 1808)
 William Burnham Woods, Supreme Court justice and politician (born 1824)
 May 19 – Charles E. Stuart, U.S. Senator from Michigan from 1853 to 1859 (born 1810)
 June 4 – William A. Wheeler, 19th Vice President of the United States from 1877 to 1881 (born 1819)
 June 25 – James Speed, U.S. Attorney General from 1864 to 1866 under Presidents Abraham Lincoln and Andrew Johnson (born 1812)
 July 18
 Dorothea Dix, mental health reformer (born 1802)
 Robert M. T. Hunter, Virginian lawyer, politician, 14th Speaker of the United States House of Representatives, 2nd Confederate States Secretary of State (born 1809)
 July 25 – John Taylor, 3rd President of the Church of Jesus Christ of Latter-day Saints (born 1808)
 August 14 – Aaron A. Sargent, U.S. Senator from California from 1873 to 1879 (born 1827)
 August 18 – Orson Squire Fowler, phrenologist and leading proponent of the octagon house (born 1809)
 August 23 – Sarah Yorke Jackson, Acting First Lady of the United States (born 1803)
 November 8 – Doc Holliday, gunfighter, gambler and dentist (TB; born 1851)
 November 11 – August Spies, labor activist, newspaper editor and anarchist (executed; born 1855 in Germany)
 December 24 – Daniel Manning, businessman, journalist and politician, Secretary of the Treasury (born 1831)

See also
Timeline of United States history (1860–1899)

References

External links
 

 
1880s in the United States
United States
United States
Years of the 19th century in the United States